Liu Xuanchen (born 16 February 1997) is a Chinese footballer who currently plays for Qingdao Red Lions in China League Two.

Career statistics

Club
.

Notes

References

1997 births
Living people
Footballers from Qingdao
Footballers from Shandong
Chinese footballers
Association football forwards
China League One players
Tianjin Tianhai F.C. players
Xinjiang Tianshan Leopard F.C. players
Guizhou F.C. players
21st-century Chinese people